Shahrak-e Hamzeh (also Romanized as Shahrak-e Ḩamzeh) is a village in Mahur Berenji Rural District, Sardasht District, Dezful County, Khuzestan Province, Iran. At the 2006 census, its population was 5,357, in 972 families. In 1359, with the beginning of the war between Iran and Iraq, some border residents such as Rafi, Bostan, Hoveiza, Abadan and Khorramshahr were transferred to safe areas such as the Hamza township. This town is located 26 km from Dezful city. Its primary inhabitants were 100 percent Arab, but after some time, some Dezful residents have been living in areas of the city to escape Iraqi missile and air strikes.

References 

Populated places in Dezful County